American Majority Action is a conservative 501(c)(4) nonprofit political action organization which focuses on voter education and mobilization efforts.

Founded in August 2010, American Majority Action is affiliated with American Majority, a nonprofit political training organization that identifies and trains grassroots candidates and activists for local and state campaigns. The founder and president of American Majority Action is Ned Ryun.

Activities
 
In October 2010, American Majority Action released the Voter Fraud App, a smartphone application developed to report and track illegal voting activity at polling places. Using photographs and text, the Voter Fraud App compiled a list of alleged vote fraud incidents and was updated in real-time throughout election day.

In 2012, American Majority Action launched a "#FireBoehner" campaign aimed at removing John Boehner from his position as Speaker of the United States House of Representatives.

References

External links

American Majority Action on OpenSecrets.org

Political organizations based in the United States
501(c)(4) nonprofit organizations
Non-profit organizations based in Purcellville, Virginia
Conservative organizations in the United States